Waki Power Station is a proposed  mini hydroelectric power station in Uganda, the third-largest economy in the East African Community.

Location
The power station will be located across the Waki River, in Butiaba, Masindi District, in Western Uganda. This location lies near the eastern shores of Lake Albert, near the point where River Waki empties into the lake.

Overview
The Waki Hydropower Project, will be a run of the river, mini-hydropower installation, with installed capacity of 5 MW. The energy generated will be fed into the national electric grid via either an 11 kV or a 22 kV transmission line. Feasibility studies were initiated in 1997. More recently, in 2006, SN Power Invest of Norway, carried out new feasibility studies on Waki and Buseruka power projects. However, SN Power Invest abandoned the project and in 2008, the development license was re-allocated to Tronder Power Limited, also from Norway. However, Tronder Power Limited also pulled out of the deal and in 2010, the license for Waki Power Station was allocated to Hydromax. The power station will be owned and operated by Hydromax, a private energy investor, who developed Buseruka Power Station in Hoima District, between 2005 and 2013.

Construction timetable
Construction was initially expected to begin in 2012, with commissioning anticipated in 2014. In October 2014, the Electricity Regulatory Authority (ERA), awarded the electricity production license to the developers of the power station. Construction is expected to begin in December 2014, with completion planned in 24 months.

See also

Africa Dams
Uganda Power Station

References

External links
Hydromaxx Applied For Waki Power Station License From ERA In November 2013

Proposed renewable energy power stations in Uganda
Hydroelectric power stations in Uganda
Masindi District
Western Region, Uganda